Ernest Boka (December 7, 1928 – April 6, 1964) was an Ivorian politician. A lawyer, Boka also served as Chief of Staff for the Governor-General of Côte d'Ivoire in 1957, Minister of National Education in 1958 and Minister of Public Service in 1959. In 1960, he was appointed President of the Supreme Court of Côte d'Ivoire. He headed the Ivorian delegation at the United Nations also in 1960. In 1963 he was accused along with others of plotting to kill President Houphouet Boigny with voodoo and died in prison the following year.  President Henri Konan Bédié built a mausoleum in his native village of Grand-Morié, a dozen kilometres from Agboville.

References

People of French West Africa
Government ministers of Ivory Coast
Ivorian diplomats
1928 births
1964 deaths
Permanent Representatives of Ivory Coast to the United Nations
20th-century Ivorian lawyers
Ivorian judges
People from Agboville
Chief justices